Carnival Diablos is the eighth studio album by Canadian heavy metal band Annihilator, released on January 29, 2001 by SPV/Steamhammer. It is the first album to feature Joe Comeau, formerly of Overkill, on vocals.

Track listing

Personnel
Performed by:
Joe Comeau – vocals
Jeff Waters – lead and rhythm guitar, bass guitar, backing vocals
Ray Hartmann – drums
Russell Bergquist – bass (not on the album)
David Scott Davis – guitars

References

Annihilator (band) albums
2001 albums
SPV/Steamhammer albums